Ephraim Mateen Salaam (born June 19, 1976) is a former American football offensive tackle. He was drafted by the Atlanta Falcons in the seventh round (199th overall) of the 1998 NFL Draft. He played college football at San Diego State.

Salaam has played for the Atlanta Falcons, Denver Broncos, Jacksonville Jaguars, Detroit Lions, and Houston Texans.

Early years
Salaam played high school football at Florin High School in Sacramento, California.

College career
Salaam became a three-year starter as both a right and left tackle at San Diego State University, where he played in 31 career games. He also played on the basketball team.

Professional career
Salaam was selected by the Atlanta Falcons in the 7th round (199th overall) of the 1998 NFL Draft. The Falcons went 14-2 during Salaam's rookie season, and won the NFC Championship to earn their first ever trip to the Super Bowl. Salaam started at right tackle in the Falcons' defeat to the Denver Broncos in Super Bowl XXXIII. Salaam was the 4th rookie in NFL history to start all 19 games including the Super Bowl. He also was the youngest player to start a Super Bowl at the age of 22.

Salaam played a total of 13 NFL seasons for five NFL teams, including the Atlanta Falcons, Denver Broncos, Jacksonville Jaguars, Houston Texans, and Detroit Lions.

Basketball
On October 31, 2013, Salaam was invited to the Texas Legends 2013 training camp. However, he was later waived on November 17.

Personal life
Salaam appeared in an ad with Texans teammate Chester Pitts during Super Bowl XLII. In the commercial, he narrates a story regarding him and Pitts while he attended San Diego State University. When at a local grocery store, Salaam said he saw Pitts bagging groceries, was impressed by his size, and convinced him to try out as a walk-on for the San Diego State Aztecs football team. The commercial goes on to show that Pitts was a second-round pick while Salaam was a seventh-round pick.

On February 10, 2013, Salaam was interviewed by United States Secretary of State Hillary Clinton at the United States Department of State. The event was put on to honor a multitude of Muslim athletes.

On January 24, 2013, Salaam revealed on a Grantland podcast that he is the nephew of Bob McAdoo.

Salaam became an analyst on Fox Sports 1 in 2013.

Movie career
Deon Taylor cast him in 2009 for his new film project Dark Christmas, which is part of the Nite Tales series.

Salaam has served as a producer on two separate TV shows, Dead Tone (2007) and Supremacy (2012).

Television career
In 2013, Salaam participated in the 23rd season of The Amazing Race with former teammate Chester Pitts. After encountering several travel delays on their way from Santiago to Lisbon, they finished in 9th Place out of 11 teams and were the third team eliminated from the race upon arrival when host Phil Keoghan arrived at Lisbon Airport, as all of the other teams in the race had already finished all of the tasks and then checked in at the Pit Stop before they even made it to Portugal. Moreover, they become the first team ever in Amazing Race history to be eliminated at the airport.

References

External links
Detroit Lions bio
Houston Texans bio

1976 births
Living people
African-American Muslims
Players of American football from Chicago
Basketball players from Chicago
American football offensive tackles
San Diego State Aztecs men's basketball players
San Diego State Aztecs football players
Atlanta Falcons players
Denver Broncos players
Jacksonville Jaguars players
Houston Texans players
Detroit Lions players
The Amazing Race (American TV series) contestants
American men's basketball players